Merloyd Lawrence Books was an imprint of Merloyd Ludington Lawrence at:

Seymour Lawrence/Delacorte Press (1965–1982)
Addison-Wesley (1982–1997)
Perseus Books Group (1997-2022)

References